Richard Ronald Bourbonnais (born April 20, 1955 in Toronto, Ontario) is a Canadian retired ice hockey right winger.

Bourbonnais played junior hockey in the Ontario Hockey Association for the Kitchener Rangers and the Ottawa 67's. He was drafted 63rd overall by the St. Louis Blues in the 1975 NHL Amateur Draft from the 67's and played 75 games for the Blues across three seasons. He was also drafted 48th overall by the Michigan Stags in the 1975 WHA Amateur Draft though he never played in the World Hockey Association.

Bourbonnais also played in the American Hockey League for the Providence Reds and Binghamton Dusters and the Central Hockey League for the Kansas City Blues and the Salt Lake Golden Eagles. He then moved to Europe in 1981, playing in France for Chamonix HC, Germany for Sportbund DJK Rosenheim and in Austria for Innsbrucker EV before moving to the German lower leagues.

Career statistics

External links

1955 births
Living people
Binghamton Dusters players
Canadian ice hockey right wingers
Chamonix HC players
Innsbrucker EV players
Kansas City Blues players
Kitchener Rangers players
Michigan Stags draft picks
Ottawa 67's players
Providence Reds players
Salt Lake Golden Eagles (CHL) players
St. Louis Blues draft picks
St. Louis Blues players
Starbulls Rosenheim players
Ice hockey people from Toronto